Ras El Ain is a town in Settat Province, Casablanca-Settat, Morocco. According to the 2004 census, it had a population of 3,638.

References

Populated places in Settat Province